Rishi Kaushik is an Indian actor who acts in serials most notably in Bengali language serials in West Bengal. He has appeared in the Star Jalsa soap operas Ekhane Aakash Neel, and Ishti Kutum, where he played the role of the male protagonist Archisman Mukherjee. Since 2020. He has acted in several television dramas of Bangladesh.

Early life
Rishi was born and grew up in an Assamese family in Tezpur, Assam. He graduated from Tezpur Academy and Guwahati University. He moved to Calcutta in 2002. His original name is Kamakhyakinkar Kaushik, while his pet name is Rishi.

Career
His debut film is an Assamese film Rong directed by Munin Barua. In Calcutta his first telefilm Daman. His debut film in Bengali is Kranti directed by Riingo Banerjee, where he played a negative role. His breakthrough performance is Ekdin Pratidin in Zee Bangla and  Ekhane Aakash Neel in Star Jalsha. He joined BJP in 2019 to be in active politics.

Personal life
In 2011, Rishi married his long-time girlfriend Debjani.

TV shows

Bangladeshi TV shows

Films and web series
 Feluda Pherot (2020) Season 1 - Chinnomostar Obhisap As Biren Choudhury/Ringmaster Karandikar
Kranti - as Deva . His character had a negative shade.
Chander Bari (2007) - as Joydip .
Villain  - as Police Inspector.
Rong (2004) - Debut film in Assamese language.

References

External links
 

Indian male television actors
Living people
People from Tezpur
Bharatiya Janata Party politicians from West Bengal
1979 births